The Yorkshire ECB County Premier League was the top level of competition for recreational club cricket in Yorkshire, England, and between 1999 and 2015 was a designated ECB Premier League.

The competing teams in 2015, which was the league's last season, were: Appleby Frodingham, Barnsley, Castleford, Cleethorpes, Doncaster Town, Driffield Town, Harrogate, Hull, Rotherham Town, Sheffield Collegiate, Sheffield United, York, and Yorkshire CCC Academy. After the 2015 season, the league was reconfigured to form the basis of two new regionalised leagues.

Castleford, Driffield, Harrogate, Hull, York, and Yorkshire CCC Academy joined a new Yorkshire Premier League North, together with six clubs promoted from the York and District Senior League (Acomb, Dunnington, Scarborough, Sheriff Hutton Bridge, Stamford Bridge, and Woodhouse Grange).
  
Appleby Frodingham, Barnsley, Cleethorpes, Doncaster Town, Rotherham Town, Sheffield Collegiate, and Sheffield & Phoenix United (formed from a merger between Sheffield United and their neighbouring club, Rotherham Phoenix) joined a new Yorkshire South Premier League, together with four clubs promoted from the South Yorkshire League (Aston Hall, Treeton, Whitley Hall, and Wickersley Old Village) and one from the Central Yorkshire League (Wakefield Thornes).

Both of these new leagues had ECB Premier League status from the outset, and the Bradford Premier League was also awarded this status effective from 2016.  The winners of these three leagues, together with the highest placed Yorkshire club in the North Yorkshire and South Durham Cricket League, then contests a Yorkshire Championship.

Winners

Performance by season

References

ECB
ECB Premier Leagues